Aaron Arthur Ferguson (30 April 197430 July 2021), professionally known as Shona Ferguson, was a Motswana actor based in South Africa, executive producer and co-founder of Ferguson Films, alongside his wife, Connie Ferguson.

Early career 
Ferguson started his journey into the world of entertainment in Lesotho as a club DJ at The Palace Hotel Night Club in 1992. After moving back to Botswana his focus shifted to the corporate world and he ended up in the IT business. Having started as a salesman, he worked his way up to become a respected businessman where he won multiple achievement awards, including Top Sales Manager Award 1998–99 while working at EDUTECH.

Acting career 
Ferguson's first major acting role was as Dr Leabua in the South African Venda language soap opera Muvhango. He left the show in March 2007. He then starred as Itumeleng from 2011 to 2013 on The Wild, a M-Net soap opera.

He, along with wife Connie Ferguson, established Ferguson Films and both starred on their film production's first series Rockville. He starred as JB from 2013 to its final episode in 2016. He also starred on 2014's The Gift, a Ferguson Films series, and starred as Jerry Maake on The Queen, also a Ferguson Films series that started in 2016. His other TV appearances include Isidingo: The Need as Tyson and Scandal! as Alex.

Ferguson Films 
In 2010, he started Ferguson Films with wife and actress, Connie Ferguson. Their productions included Rockville, iGazi, The Gift, The Throne, The Herd, The Queen, The River and The Imposter.

In 2020, they produced a Netflix six-part series called Kings of Joburg.

Movies 
Ferguson was cast in the 2010 film Mrs. Mandela.

Personal life 
Ferguson met actress Connie Masilo on 31 July 2001. They married in November of that year.

Awards and nominations 
He received the Golden Horn Award for Best Actor in a TV Soap and Golden Horn Award for Best Achievement by a Lead Actor in a Made for TV Movie.

Death 
On 26 June 2021, Ferguson was admitted to Pinehaven Hospital with COVID-19. With his condition getting worse, he was airlifted towards the mid-days of July to Milpark Hospital in Johannesburg, where he died on 30 July 2021, aged 47. He was buried at the Fourways Memorial Park, after a private funeral. A memorial service was held two days later, where the attendance was limited to 50 due to COVID-19 lockdown regulations.

References

External links 
 

1974 births
2021 deaths
Tswana people
South African male actors
People from Gaborone
Botswana emigrants to South Africa
South African people of Botswana descent
Deaths from the COVID-19 pandemic in South Africa